Cassembe may refer to:

Cassembe, Angola
Cassembe, Mozambique